Time is the fifth studio album by Paul Overstreet. It was released February 27, 1996. The album peaked at No. 37 on the Billboard 200 chart. The song "We've Got to Keep on Meeting Like This" charted at No. 73 on the Hot Country Songs chart.

Critical reception

Mark Brinkman of Country Standard Time begins his review of Time with, "Smooth, straight-ahead, positive, and feel-good are all thoughts that come to mind as one listens to Paul Overstreet's latest."

The review at Christian Library by Wes L. Bredenhof states, "Paul Overstreet's latest album continues his tradition of playing country music with strong Christian themes." He concludes with, "Unlike his previous releases, Time will probably not be available in mainstream record stores, since it has been released by a small independent company."

Track listing

Musicians 

 Paul Overstreet – vocals, background vocals
 Eddie Bayers – drums
 Mark Casstevens – acoustic guitar
 Dan Dugmore – steel guitar
 Sonny Garrish – steel guitar
 Greg Gordon – background vocals
 David Hungate – bass
 Paul Leim – drums
 Brent Mason – electric guitar
 Terry McMillan – harmonica
 Steve Nathan – piano
 Louis Dean Nunley – background vocals
 Don Potter – acoustic guitar
 Gary Prim – piano
 Matt Rollings – piano
 Brent Rowan – electric guitar
 Hank Singer – fiddle
 Neil Thrasher – background vocals
 Bob Wray – bass
 Reggie Young – electric guitar

Production

 Joe Bogan – engineer
 Jerry Crutchfield – producer
 Don Moen – executive producer
 Jonathan Russell – mastering
 Denny Purcell – mastering
 John Guess – mixing
 Christopher Bogan – assistant engineer
 Joe Hayden – assistant engineer
 Craig White – engineer
 Cari Landers – production coordination
 Ben Pearson – photography
 Buddy Jackson – art direction
 Christie Knubel – design
 Robert Charles – assistant engineer
 Don Cobb – digital editing
 T. Michael Coleman – executive producer

Track information and credits adapted from AllMusic.

Charts

Album

Singles

References

1996 albums
Paul Overstreet albums
albums produced by Jerry Crutchfield